Marko Varalahti is a former strongman competitor from Finland who is best known for competing in the 1995 World's Strongest Man competition, finishing in 3rd place. Varalahti also won Finland's Strongest Man in 1995.

Honours
Finland's Strongest Man (1995)
3rd place World's Strongest Man  (1995)

References

Finnish strength athletes
Living people
Year of birth missing (living people)